Exterminate All the Brutes by Sven Lindqvist is a historical and philosophical investigation of the roots of European colonialism, racism, and genocide in Africa. The book takes its title from the infamous phrase used by the character Kurtz in Joseph Conrad's 1899 Heart of Darkness.

Overview 

Lindqvist explores the history of European racism from the late eighteenth century to the twentieth century. In the same vein as Edward Said's Orientalism, Lindqvist contextualizes Conrad's Heart of Darkness and examines the impact of European explorers, theologians, politicians, and historians on the development of racist ideologies. Lindqvist's aim is to help readers comprehend the horrific statement "Exterminate all the brutes" by tracing its roots back to European colonial policies. Lindqvist's argument echoes that of Hannah Arendt's 1951 The Origins of Totalitarianism but his approach is unique in that he blends his artistic and biographical insights to create a distinct perspective.

Historian Adam Hochschild writes the introduction to the book, where Lindqvist explores the history of European colonialism in Africa, from the earliest explorers to the genocides of the 20th century, examining the ways in which European imperialism relied on the dehumanization of African people and the creation of a racist ideology that justified their exploitation and extermination.

The book looks at how this ideology was reinforced through popular culture and literature, such as the work of Conrad, and argues that it continues to shape contemporary attitudes towards Africa and its people.

Lindqvist draws on a wide range of sources, including historical accounts, literature, and personal experience, to analyse the legacy of colonialism in Africa and its ongoing impact on the world today.

The work was Lindqvist's favourite among his books. Its title is taken from a phrase uttered by the murderous racist imperialist Mr Kurtz in Joseph Conrad's 1899 novella Heart of Darkness. As a boy, Lindqvist had seen a photograph of the emaciated corpses at Buchenwald concentration camp. He stated that the image of Nazi atrocity and the novella came together in his mind, and in Exterminate all the Brutes he argues that Hitler grew up in a time when the whole of the Western world was "soaked in the conviction" that imperialism was a biological necessity that inevitably destroyed "the lower races". Lindqvist argued controversially that this had already killed millions in genocides before Hitler's application of the principle to white people, and noted that his book had resulted in academic study of the "effect of colonial atrocities on Nazi crimes".

Publication history 

The first English translation, using Conrad's original English phrase "Exterminate all the brutes" as its title, was published in New York by New Press in 1996.

The book has been translated into Finnish, Danish, Norwegian, Spanish, French, German, Italian, Korean, Portuguese, Croatian, Russian, Polish, Kurdish and English.

Legacy 

Lindqvist's book Exterminate all the Brutes is included in Jan Gradvall's 2009 Tusen svenska klassiker ("A Thousand Swedish Classics"). 

Lindqvist continued to examine the history of racism and genocide in the books The Skull Measurer's Mistake (Antirasister: människor och argument i kampen mot rasismen, 1996), A History of Bombing (Nu dog du: bombernas århundrade, 2001), Terra Nullius (2007), and Intent to Destroy (Avsikt att förinta, 2008).

Dramatizations of the content have been performed on stage in Sweden and France. In the spring of 2020, it was announced that the filmmaker Raoul Peck based a documentary series for HBO – about the history of European colonialism – on, among other things, Lindqvist's book. The award-winning series is eponymous with the book "Exterminate All the Brutes". Lindqvist appears as himself in the series cast.

See also 

 Cultural hegemony
 White supremacy
 White nationalism

References

Further reading 

 Lindqvist, Sven (1996). Exterminate all the brutes. New Press, New York. 
 Said, Edward (1978). Orientalism. Pantheon Books.

External links 

 Full text from archive.org
 Exterminate all the brutes (Book Review) By: Melancon, Glenn, Historian, 00182370, Spring98, Vol. 60, Issue 3
 Trevelyan, Raleigh. “A Murderous Burden.” New York Times Book Review, Aug. 1996, p. 26.

Genocide
Colonialism
Swedish literature
1996 books